Reşat Nuri Güntekin (25 November 1889 – 7 December 1956) was a Turkish novelist, storywriter, and playwright. His best known novel, Çalıkuşu ("The Wren", 1922) is about the destiny of a young Turkish female teacher in Anatolia. This work is translated into Persian by Seyyed Borhan Ghandili. His other significant novels include Dudaktan Kalbe ("From the Lips to the Heart", 1925), and Yaprak Dökümü ("The Fall of Leaves", 1930). Many of his novels have been adapted to cinema and television. Because he visited Anatolia with his duty as an inspector, he knew Anatolian people closely. In his works he dealt with life and social problems in Anatolia; reflects people in the human-environment relationship.

Biography
His father was a medical doctor Doktor Nuri Bey. Reşat Nuri attended primary school in Çanakkale, the Çanakkale Secondary School and the İzmir School of Freres. He graduated from Istanbul University, Faculty of Literature in 1912. He worked as a teacher and administrator at high schools in Bursa and Istanbul, he taught literature, French and philosophy; then he worked as an inspector at the Ministry of National Education (1931). He served as the deputy of Çanakkale between 1933 and 1943 in the Turkish Parliament, the chief inspector at the Ministry of National Education (1947), and a cultural attaché to Paris (1950), when he was also the Turkish representative to UNESCO.

After his retirement, he served at the literary board of the Istanbul Municipal Theatres. Reşat Nuri Güntekin died in London, where he had gone to be treated for his lung cancer. He is buried at the Karacaahmet Cemetery in Istanbul.

Works

Stories
 Recm, Gençlik ve Güzellik (1919)
 Roçild Bey (1919)
 Eski Ahbab (Without known time)
 Tanrı Misafiri (1927)
 Sönmüş Yıldızlar (1928)
 Leylâ ile Mecnun (1928)
 Olağan İşler (1930)

Novels
 Çalıkuşu (1922) (The Wren - translated as: "The Autobiography of a Turkish Girl")
 Gizli El (1924)
 Damga (1924)
 Dudaktan Kalbe (1923) (From the Lip to the Heart)
 Akşam Güneşi (1926) (Afternoon Sun)
 Bir Kadın Düşmanı (1927)
 Yeşil Gece (1928) (The Green Night)
 Acımak (1928) (To Pity)
 Yaprak Dökümü (1930) (The Fall of Leaves)
 Eski Hastalık (1938) (That Old Sickness)
 Değirmen (1944) (The Mill)
 Kızılcık Dalları (1944)
 Miskinler Tekkesi (1946)
 Harabelerin Çiçeği (1953)
 Kavak Yelleri (1961)
 Son Sığınak (1961) (The Last Shelter)
 Kan Davası (1962)
 Ateş Gecesi (1953) (The Night of Fire)

Theatre
 Hançer (1920)
 Eski Rüya (1922) (The Old Dream)
 Ümidin Güneşi (1924) (Hope's Sun)
 Gazeteci Düşmanı, Şemsiye Hırsızı (The Umbrella Thief), İhtiyar Serseri (1925, three works)
 Taş Parçası (1926)
 Bir Köy Hocası (1928)
 İstiklâl (1933) (Independence)
 Hülleci (1933)
 Yaprak Dökümü (1971)
 Eski Şarkı(1971) (The Old Song)
 Balıkesir Muhasebecisi (1971) (The Accountant Of Balıkesir)
 Tanrıdağı Ziyafeti (1971)

See also
List of Turkish diplomats

References

 Biyografi.info - Biography of Reşat Nuri Güntekin
 Biyografi.net - Biography and Bibliography of Reşat Nuri Güntekin
 Turkishculture.org - Resat Nuri Güntekin

Burials at Karacaahmet Cemetery
Turkish novelists
Turkish male short story writers
Turkish dramatists and playwrights
20th-century Turkish diplomats
Writers from Istanbul
Istanbul University alumni
1889 births
1956 deaths
Deaths from lung cancer in England
Novelists from the Ottoman Empire
Akbaba (periodical) people
20th-century novelists
20th-century dramatists and playwrights
20th-century Turkish short story writers
20th-century male writers
Members of the 5th Parliament of Turkey
Members of the 8th Parliament of Turkey